Absolonia is a genus of springtails belonging to the family Onychiuridae.

Species:
 Absolonia gigantea (Absolon, 1901)

References

Collembola
Springtail genera